The mixed doubles tournament of the 2022 European Junior Badminton Championships was held from 22 to 27 August. Matthias Kicklitz and Thuc Phuong Nguyen from Germany clinched this title in the last edition.

Seeds 
Seeds were announced on 5 August.

  Jarne Schlevoigt / Julia Meyer
  Viktor Petrovic / Andjela Vitman
  Mael Cattoen / Camille Pognante
  Lucas Renoir / Tea Margueritte 
  Kean Gabor Kigyos / Nikol Szabina Vetor 
  Ruben Garcia / Lucia Rodriguez 
  Noah Haase / Kirsten De Wit 
  Hjalte Johansen / Emma Irring Braüner

  Yohan Barbieri / Elsa Jacob
  Rodrigo Sanjurjo / Nikol Carulla
  Simon Bailoni / Lena Rumpold 
  Stanimir Terziev / Tsvetina Popivanova 
  Jonathan Dresp / Anna Mejikovskiy
  Yevhenii Stolovoi / Yevheniia Kantemyr
  Nikolaj Stupplich / Elina Sonnenschein
  Oliver Butler / Estelle Van Leeuwen

Draw

Finals

Top half

Section 1

Section 2

Section 3

Section 4

Bottom half

Section 5

Section 6

Section 7

References

External links 
Draw

2022 European Junior Badminton Championships